Coast Hotels Limited, a fully owned subsidiary of APA Hotels Canada, Inc. is one of North America's fastest-growing and Canada's largest hotel brands. With corporate offices in Vancouver, B.C. and Seattle, WA, Coast Hotels owns, manages and franchises hotels under the Coast Hotels brand and also manages properties independently. 

Coast Hotels offers unique, one-of-a-kind properties throughout British Columbia, Alberta, Saskatchewan, the Yukon, Alaska, California, Hawaii, and Washington State.

Coast Hotels offers a loyalty program called Coast Rewards. Members can earn points the moment they join on every qualifying dollar spent with every stay and points can be redeemed for complimentary stays, room upgrades, travel packages and merchandise. Coast Rewards offers members five benefit tiers - Pink, Purple, Silver, Gold and Platinum. In addition, Cast Rewards members have the option to accumulate points with Aeroplan, Alaska Airlines Mileage or More Rewards in place of Coast Rewards points.

Property locations
British Columbia: 19
Alberta: 9
Saskatchewan: 1
Yukon: 1
Alaska: 1
California: 3
Washington: 4
Hawaii: 1

References

External links

Hotel chains in the United States
Hotel and leisure companies of Canada